Sina Khadempour (born January 9, 1997) is an Iranian professional football player who most recently played for Darya Babol in the Azadegan League. He has also played for the Iran national under-23 football team.

Club career

Club career statistics

International career
Khadempour has played 2 matches for Iran under-20 in 2017 FIFA U-20 World Cup.

Honours 
Naft Tehran
 Hazfi Cup: 2016–17

References

External links 

 Sina Khadempour at PersianLeague.com
 Sina Khadempour at Soccerway
 Sina Khadempour on Instagram
 Sina Khadempour at metafootball

1997 births
Living people
Naft Tehran F.C. players
Esteghlal F.C. players
Iranian footballers
Association football midfielders